Rock Island State Park can refer to:

Rock Island State Park (Tennessee)
Rock Island State Park (Wisconsin)

See also
Rock Island Trail State Park (disambiguation)
Rock Island (disambiguation)